Littoraria nebulosa is a species of sea snail, a marine gastropod mollusk in the family Littorinidae, the winkles or periwinkles.

Distribution

Description 
The maximum recorded shell length is 28 mm.

Habitat 
Minimum recorded depth is -1 m. Maximum recorded depth is 0 m.

References

External links

Littorinidae
Taxa named by Jean-Baptiste Lamarck
Gastropods described in 1822